The Fussball Club Basel 1893 1976–77 season was their 83rd season since the club was founded. It was their 31st consecutive season in the top flight of Swiss football after they won promotion during the season 1945–46. They played their home games in the St. Jakob Stadium. René Theler was voted as new chairman at the AGM and took over from Félix Musfeld, who had been the club chairman over the previous six seasons.

Overview

Pre-season
Helmut Benthaus was first team manager for the twelfth consecutive season. There were only a few changes in the team squad this season. Detlev Lauscher joined from 1. FC Köln. Lauscher had played five seasons for 1. FC Köln in the German first division, helping the club finish as runners-up in the league and cup during 1973. Jean-Pierre Maradan joined from lower tier Grenchen but quickly became a key player. Again Benthaus relied upon the young players who had come up from the reserve team when needed in the first team.

Basel played a total of 56 games in their 1976–77 season. 33 in the domestic league, two in the Swiss Cup, two in the Swiss League Cup, four in the Cup of the Alps, four in the 1976–77 UEFA Cup and 11 were friendly matches. The team scored a total of 134 goals and conceded 80. Basel won eight of their friendly games, drew two and lost one of them.

Domestic league
The Swiss Football Association had reformed the Swiss football league system that year reducing the number of teams in the Nationalliga A from 14 to 12 and increasing the Nationalliga B teams from 14 to 16. The Nationalliga A season 1976–77 was contested by the first 11 teams from the previous season and the sole promoted team AC Bellinzona. The champions would qualify for the 1977–78 European Cup and the Swiss Cup winners would qualify for 1977–78 Cup Winners' Cup. The UEFA modified the entry rules for Switzerland, therefore, this season three teams would qualify for the 1977–78 UEFA Cup.

The Nationalliga A was played in two stages. The qualification phase was played by all teams in a double round-robin and, after completion, divided into two groups. The first six teams contended in the championship group (with half of the points obtained in the qualification as bonus) and the positions seventh to twelfth contended the relegation group. Basel finished the qualification phase in second position with 33 points from 22 games and so entered the championship group with a bonus of 17. At the end of the championship phase Servette and Basel were level on 29 points. They therefore had to play a play-off for champions. This play-off was held at the Wankdorf Stadium in Bern in front of 55,000 supporters. Basel won the match 2–1, their goals being scored by Walter Mundschin and Arthur von Wartburg. Basel were awarded the championship title and qualified for the 1977–78 European Cup. Servette, Zürich and Grasshopper Club qualified for the 1977–78 UEFA Cup.

Swiss Cup and League Cup
In the Swiss Cup Basel won away from home against lower tier Fribourg in the round of 32 and in the round of 16 were drawn away against Xamax but were defeated. In the Swiss League Cup they won away from home against lower tier Grenchen. Then in the round of 16 were drawn away against Luzern and here they were defeated. Young Boys won the competition this season.

UEFA Cup
In the first round of the 1976–77 UEFA Cup Basel were drawn against Northern Ireland team Glentoran F.C. Basel won 5–3 on aggregate. In the second round they were drawn against Spanish team Athletic Bilbao. After a draw in the first leg, they were defeated 1–3 in the second leg, thus lost 2–4 on aggregate.

Players 

 
 

 
 
 
 
 

 
 
 
 
 
 
 

Players who left the squad

Results 
Legend

Friendly matches

Pre-season and mid-season

Winter break to end of season

Nationalliga A

Qualifying phase matches

Qualifying phase table

Championship group matches

Championship group table

Play-off match

Swiss Cup

Swiss League Cup

UEFA Cup

First round

Basel won 5–3 on aggregate.
Second round

Athletic Bilbao won 4–2 on aggregate.

Cup of the Alps 

Group B

NB: teams did not play compatriots

Group table

See also
 History of FC Basel
 List of FC Basel players
 List of FC Basel seasons

Sources and references
 Rotblau: Jahrbuch Saison 2015/2016. Publisher: FC Basel Marketing AG. 
 Switzerland 1976–77 at RSSSF
 Swiss League Cup at RSSSF
 Cup of the Alps 1976 at RSSSF

External links
 FC Basel official site

FC Basel seasons
Basel
1976-77